The Rocky Mountains, commonly known as the Rockies, are a major mountain range in western North America.

Rocky Mountain or variant may also refer to:

Mountains
Rocky Mountain (Fannin County, Georgia)
Rocky Mountain (Gilmer County, Georgia)
Rocky Mountain (Lumpkin County, Georgia)
Rocky Mountain (Rabun County, Georgia)
Rocky Mountain (Towns County, Georgia)
Rocky Mountain (Union County, Georgia)-1
Rocky Mountain (Union County, Georgia)-2
Rocky Mountain (Union County, Georgia)-3
Rocky Mountain (White County, Georgia)
Rocky Mountain (Montana), a mountain peak of Montana
Rocky Mountain (New Jersey)
Rocky Mountain (Ulster County, New York)
Rocky Mountain (Rockbridge County, Virginia)

Places
Rocky Mountain House, Alberta, Canada
Rocky Mountain, Nova Scotia, Canada
Rocky Mountain, Oklahoma, U.S.

Other uses
Rocky Mountains (album), a 2012 album by Lasse Stefanz
Rocky Mountain (film), a 1950 Western movie starring Errol Flynn
The Rocky Mountains (painting)
The Rocky Mountains, Lander's Peak, an 1863 landscape oil painting by Albert Bierstadt
Rocky Mountain Horse, a horse breed developed in Kentucky
Rocky Mountain Bicycles
Rocky Mountain Chocolate Factory
Rocky Mountain Construction

See also
Canadian Rocky Mountains
Rocky Mountains
Little Rocky Mountains
North American Cordillera, the entire set of mountain ranges on the west coast of North America
Southern Rocky Mountains
 The Rockies (disambiguation)
Western Rocky Mountains